Garra quadrimaculata is a species of ray-finned fish in the genus Garra. It is mainly found on the Arabian Peninsula (Saudi Arabia and Yemen), but also in southeastern Eritrea, southeastern Ethiopia.

References 

Garra
Fish of Ethiopia
Fish described in 1835